Dactylochirotida is an order of primitive sea cucumbers. Unlike other sea cucumbers, their tentacles are not divided into multiple branches, and the body is enclosed within a flexible shell-like structure called a test.

References

Dendrochirotacea